Lemuel Hastings Arnold (January 29, 1792June 27, 1852) was an American politician from the U.S. state of Rhode Island. A Whig, he served as the 12th Governor of the State of Rhode Island and a member of the U.S. House of Representatives.

Early life

Arnold was born in St. Johnsbury, Vermont, the son of Congress of the Confederation delegate Jonathan Arnold and Cynthia (Hastings) Arnold. His father died soon after his birth, and Arnold's mother moved the family to Rhode Island. He attended the local schools and graduated from Dartmouth College in 1811. Arnold then studied law and was admitted to the bar in 1814. He began the practice of law in Providence, Rhode Island, and practiced law there for seven years before becoming involved in manufacturing.

Career
He began his political career as a member of the Rhode Island House of Representatives, serving in the State House from 1826-1831. In 1831, he was elected Governor of the State of Rhode Island, and served as governor from 1831-1833. Arnold also served as a member of the Rhode Island Executive Council during the Dorr Rebellion from 1842 to 1843.

Following an unsuccessful attempt for a seat in the United States Senate in 1845, he was elected to the United States House of Representatives as a member of the Whig Party and served one term from 1845 to 1847.

After leaving politics, he practiced law in South Kingstown, Rhode Island, until his death on June 27, 1852. He is interred in Swan Point Cemetery in Providence.

Family life
Arnold was the great-great-uncle of U.S. Senator Theodore F. Green.

Arnold married Sally Lyman, and they had nine children. Their son, Richard Arnold, was a brigadier general in the Union Army during the Civil War. Their daughter, Sally Lyman Arnold, was married to Union Brig. Gen. Isaac P. Rodman, who was mortally wounded at the Battle of Antietam. After his wife Sally's death, Arnold married Catherine Shannard.

References

External links

 

 Descendants of Thomas Hastings website
 National Governors Association
	
	

1792 births
1852 deaths
Governors of Rhode Island
Members of the Rhode Island House of Representatives
Members of the United States House of Representatives from Rhode Island
Dartmouth College alumni
People from St. Johnsbury, Vermont
People from South Kingstown, Rhode Island
Rhode Island Whigs
Politicians from Providence, Rhode Island
People from Providence County, Rhode Island
Rhode Island lawyers
Burials at Swan Point Cemetery
Whig Party members of the United States House of Representatives
19th-century American politicians
Whig Party state governors of the United States
19th-century American lawyers